Norwegian Independent Company 1 (NOR.I.C.1, pronounced Norisén (approx. "noor-ee-sehn") in Norwegian) was a British  Special Operations Executive (SOE) group formed in March 1941 originally for the purpose of performing commando raids during the occupation of Norway by Nazi Germany. Organized under the leadership of Captain Martin Linge, it soon became a pool of talent for a variety of special operations in Norway.

History

The original English-language administrative title did not have much resonance in Norwegian and they soon became better known as Kompani Linge (Linge's Company). Martin Linge's death early in the war came to enhance the title, which became formalised as Lingekompaniet in his honour.

The members of the unit were trained at various locations in the United Kingdom, including at the SOE establishment at Drumintoul Lodge in the Cairngorms, Scotland.

Their initial raids in 1941 were to Lofoten (Operation Claymore) and Måløy (Operation Archery), where Martin Linge was killed. Their best known raids were probably the Norwegian heavy water sabotage. Other raids included the Thamshavnbanen sabotage. In the capital area, the Oslogjengen carried out several sabotage missions.  In cooperation with Milorg, the main Norwegian resistance organisation, communication lines with London were gradually improved during the war, so that by 1945, 64 radio operators were spread throughout Norway.

According to Mitt liv, the autobiography of Max Manus (1995. N.W. Damm), the Linge Company was for a time counted amongst the most decorated military forces in the United Kingdom during World War II. The veterans from the company were also amongst the first to welcome King Haakon home. A total of 530 Norwegians served in NOR.I.C.1, of whom 57 died.

Members

 Alf Aakre
 Karl Johan Aarsæther
 Knut Aarsæther
 Olav Aarsæther
 Jan Allan
 Johannes S. Andersen
 Odd Andersen
 Gunnar Bjålie
 Svein Blindheim
 Jan Baalsrud
 Erik Gjems-Onstad
  Arne Gjestland

 Gregers Gram
 Evald Hansen
 Nils Uhlin Hansen
 Knut Haugland
 Knut Haukelid
 Claus Helberg
 Kasper Idland
 Fredrik Kayser
 Arne Kjelstrup
 Claus Gustav Myrin Koren
 Jan Herman Linge
 Martin Linge
 Erling Sven Lorentzen 
 Max Manus

 Alf Malland
 Oskar Johan Nordvik
 Herluf Nygaard
 Martin Olsen
 George Parker
   Alv Kristian Pedersen
 Bjørn Pedersen
 Arthur Pevik
 Johnny Pevik
 Jens-Anton Poulsson
 Birger Rasmussen
 August Rathke (11 December 1925 - 25 December 2022, Last surviving member)
 Boy Rist
 Joachim Rønneberg
 Harald Sandvik
 Einar Skinnarland
 Ingebjørg Skoghaug

 Odd Starheim
 Inge Steensland
  Kjell Stordalen
 Hans Storhaug
 Harald Stuve
 Gunnar Sønsteby
 Edvard Tallaksen
 Anton Telnes
 Ragnar Ulstein
 Knut Wigert
 Birger Strømsheim

Operation Seagull agents

 Cpl. Sverre Granlund - had also served as a commando during Operation Musketoon
 Sgt. Thorlief Daniel Grong
 Lt. Per Getz
 Pte. Eivind Dahl Eriksen
 Pte. Hans Rohde Hansen
 Tobias Skog

Telavåg agents
 Emil Gustav Hvaal (codename Anchor)
 Arne Vaerum (codename Penguin)

References

Sources
 Jensen, Erling; Ratvik, Per; Ulstein, Ragnar (1995) Kompani Linge (Oslo: LibriArte) 
 Manus, Max  (1995) Mitt liv (N.W. Damm)  

Special Operations Executive
Independent
Military units and formations established in 1941
Military units and formations disestablished in 1945
1941 establishments in the United Kingdom
1945 disestablishments in Norway
Commando units and formations
Military units and formations of World War II